Patrick McCluskey (13 April 1952 – 24 August 2020) was a Scottish footballer. He spent most of his career in the Scottish League, except for part of one season in Ireland and one season in the United States.

Career
In 1970, McCluskey began his professional career with Celtic. However, he went on loan that first season to Sligo Rovers in Ireland. When he returned to Scotland, he soon became a fixture in the Celtic first team, garnering 195 appearances in all competitions (12 goals), winning five domestic honours – the Scottish League title in 1972–73 and 1973–74, the Scottish Cup in 1973–74 and 1974–75, and the Scottish League Cup in 1974–75 – and playing in two European Cup semi-finals (1972 and 1974), but fell out of the team after the emergence of Roy Aitken and the signing of Pat Stanton, moving to second-tier Dumbarton in 1977 for £15,000, where he spent three seasons.

In 1980, he transferred to Airdrieonians for two seasons. In the autumn of 1982, he signed with the Pittsburgh Spirit of the Major Indoor Soccer League. He spent only one season in the United States before returning to Scotland where he finished his career with Queen of the South.

He was not related to forward George McCluskey, who played at Celtic during the same era.

McCluskey died on 24 August 2020, at the age of 68.

References

External links
MISL stats

McCluskey, Pat, The Celtic Wiki

1952 births
2020 deaths
Airdrieonians F.C. (1878) players
Celtic F.C. players
Dumbarton F.C. players
Major Indoor Soccer League (1978–1992) players
Pittsburgh Spirit players
Queen of the South F.C. players
Scottish footballers
Scottish expatriate footballers
Maryhill F.C. players
Scottish Junior Football Association players
Scotland under-23 international footballers
Scottish Football League players
Association football defenders
Association football midfielders
People from Kilsyth
Footballers from North Lanarkshire
Expatriate association footballers in the Republic of Ireland
Expatriate soccer players in the United States
Scottish expatriate sportspeople in the United States
Scottish expatriate sportspeople in Ireland
Sligo Rovers F.C. players
League of Ireland players